A landslide victory is an election result in which the victorious candidate or party wins by an overwhelming margin. The term became popular in the 1800s to describe a victory in which the opposition is "buried", similar to the way in which a geological landslide buries whatever is in its path. What constitutes a landslide varies by the type of electoral system. Even within an electoral system, there is no consensus on what sized margin makes for a landslide.

Notable examples

Argentina

 2011 Argentine general election – Cristina Fernández de Kirchner of the Front for Victory won a second term as President of Argentina in a landslide victory. She received 54.11% of votes, while no other candidate received more than 16.81%.

Australia
State and territory elections:
 1989 Queensland state election – Wayne Goss led the Labor Party to a historic landslide victory over the Country Party (later known as the National Party) led by Russell Cooper. The Country Party had been in power for 32 consecutive years; from 1957–1983 the Country Party ruled as the senior partner in a coalition with the Liberal Party, and then from 1983–1989 the Country Party ruled alone. Much of this 32 year period was under 7-term Premier Joh Bjelke-Petersen. In the election, Labor won 50.3% of the primary vote and 53.8% of the two-party preferred (TPP) vote, and 54 out of 89 seats, despite a system of malapportionment which was designed to keep the Country Party in power.
 2011 New South Wales state election – Barry O'Farrell led the Liberal–National Coalition to win 69 out of the 93 seats in the lower house, defeating Kristina Keneally's Labor government. The Coalition had a primary vote of 51.14% and a TPP of 64.22%.
 2012 Queensland state election – Campbell Newman led the Liberal National Party (formed from a joining of the National Party and Liberal Party in Queensland) to win 78 seats out of the 89 seats in parliament, defeating Anna Bligh's Labor government. The Liberal National Party had a primary vote of 49.66% and a TPP vote of 62.8%.
 2014 Tasmanian state election – The Liberal Party, led by Will Hodgman, won a landslide victory, defeating the incumbent Labor government, led by Premier Lara Giddings. This ended 16 years of Labor government in Tasmania. The Liberal Party won 15 of the 25 seats and 51.22% of the primary vote, while Labor won seven seats and 27.33% of the primary vote and the Greens won three seats and 13.83% of the primary vote. There was also a 12.83% swing to the Liberal Party.
 2018 Victorian state election – The first-term incumbent Labor government, led by Daniel Andrews, was re-elected in a landslide victory, winning 55 out of 88 seats in the lower house, an increase of eight seats from the previous election in 2014. The Coalition suffered an 11-seat swing against it, and won 27 seats. With a primary vote of 42.86% and TPP of 57.30%, it tied Victorian Labor's second-best showing at the state level. 
 2021 Western Australian state election – Mark McGowan led the Labor Party to win 53 out of the 59 seats in the lower house. The Labor Party had a primary vote of 59.92% and a two-party-preferred vote of 69.68%. The National Party won 4 seats and the Liberal Party won 2 seats, making the National Party the official opposition, the first time they had held this status since the 1940s.
Federal elections:
 1931 Australian federal election – Joseph Lyons, leader of the United Australia Party and of the Coalition (which also consisted of the Country Party) won a landslide victory over the single-term Labor government of Prime Minister James Scullin. This was the last time that a government has only served a single term at the federal level.
 1943 Australian federal election – The incumbent Labor Government led by war-time PM John Curtin won a landslide victory over the Coalition led by Country Party leader Arthur Fadden.
 1966 Australian federal election – PM Harold Holt leads his incumbent Coalition Government (now consisting of the Liberal Party and Country Party) to a landslide victory over the Labor Opposition, increasing their majority by a further 10 seats, the Liberals almost won enough seats to govern in their own right without the Country Party.
 1975 Australian federal election – Coalition led by Liberal Party's Malcolm Fraser won a landslide victory over Labor Government led by PM Gough Whitlam Winning 91 out of 127 Seats.
 1983 Australian federal election – Labor led by Bob Hawke wins landslide victory (75 of 125 seats, an increase of 24, and 49.48% of the primary vote) over Coalition Government led by PM Malcolm Fraser
 1996 Australian federal election – Coalition led by Liberal Party's John Howard wins landslide victory over Labor Government led by PM Paul Keating, ending 13 consecutive years of Labor government. The Coalition as a whole wins 94 of 148 seats, winning the largest majority government to date in Australian history. The Liberal Party alone wins 75 seats – enough to govern in its own right, however they choose to include the National Party (formerly the Country Party) and the Country Liberal Party in the Coalition Government.
 2007 Australian federal election – Labor led by Kevin Rudd wins landslide victory over Coalition Government led by PM John Howard who had been in office for 11 consecutive years. Not only did the Coalition lose government but John Howard lost his seat.
 2013 Australian federal election – Coalition led by Liberal Party's Tony Abbott wins landslide victory over Labor Government led by PM Kevin Rudd, winning 90 out of 150 seats.
Notable non-landslides:
 The 1972 Australian federal election resulted in a victory for Labor under Gough Whitlam, ending 23 consecutive years of Coalition government. However, the result was not a landslide with Labor only winning 67 of 125 seats.
 The 2019 Australian federal election, whilst polls showing a Labor victory, was won by the Coalition. The elected Prime Minister, Scott Morrison, became the first to serve a full term in office (serving one and a half terms) since John Howard. Scott Morrison famously used the phrase "the quiet Australians" in a speech following his victory.
 The 2022 Australian federal election resulted in a victory for Labor, ending 9 years of Coalition government. It was a historic loss for the Coalition, which was reduced to just 58 seats of 151 seats, their worst result in 70 years. However, Labor only won a slim majority, 77 of 151 seats. This is because the Coalition losses were split between Labor, teal independents and the Greens, while Labor themselves also lost seats to independents and Greens.

Barbados 
In Barbadian general elections, a landslide victory involves a large swing from one party to another as well as one party winning a large majority in parliament. Landslide victories have usually occurred after a long period of government from one particular party and a change in the popular mood.
 1986 Barbadian general election - The Democratic Labour Party led by Opposition Leader Errol Barrow won 24 out of 27 seats House of Assembly and 59.45% of the popular vote
 1999 Barbadian general election – The Barbados Labour Party led by Prime Minister Owen Arthur won all 28 out of 30 seats in the House of Assembly and 64.87% of the popular vote.
 2018 Barbadian general election – The Barbados Labour Party led by Opposition Leader Mia Mottley won all 30 seats in the House of Assembly and 74.6% of the popular vote.
 2022 Barbadian general election – The Barbados Labour Party led by Prime Minister Mia Mottley won all 30 seats in the House of Assembly and 69.0% of the popular vote.

Brazil 
 1994 Brazilian general election – PSDB candidate Fernando Henrique Cardoso wins 54% over Lula's 27% and Enéas' 7%.

Canada 

In a Canadian federal election, a landslide victory occurs when a political party gains a significant majority of the House of Commons of Canada.

Landslide victories may also occur during provincial elections, and territorial elections in Yukon. Landslide victories are not possible for territorial elections in the Northwest Territories, and Nunavut, as its members are elected without reference to political parties, operating as a consensus government.

National landslide victories

The following Canadian federal elections resulted in landslide victories:
1874 – The Liberals won 133 seats while the Conservatives won just 73 seats.
1878 – The Conservatives won 137 seats while the Liberals won just 69 seats.
1882 – The Conservatives won 139 seats while the Liberals won just 71 seats.
1900 – The Liberals won 132 seats while the Conservatives won just 81.
1904 – The Liberals won 139 seats while the Conservatives won just 75.
1908 – The Liberals won 133 seats while the Conservatives won just 85.
1911 – The Conservatives won 133 seats while the Liberals won just 86.
1917 – The Conservatives won 153 seats while the Liberals won just 82.
1930 – The Conservatives won 137 seats while the Liberals won just 91.
1935 – The Liberals won 171 seats while the Conservatives won just 39.
1940 – The Liberals won 178 seats while the Progressive Conservatives won just 39.
1949 – The Liberals won 190 seats while the Progressive Conservatives won just 41.
1953 – The Liberals won 171 seats while the Progressive Conservatives won just 51.
1958 – The Progressive Conservatives won 208 seats while the Liberals won just 48.
1968 – The Liberals won 155 seats while the Progressive Conservatives won just 72.
1984 – The Progressive Conservatives won 211 seats while the Liberals won just 40.
1993 – The Liberals won 177 seats while the Bloc Quebecois, which ran only in Québec, won 54. The ruling Progressive Conservatives dropped from 154 to 2.
2015 – The Liberals led by Justin Trudeau won 184 seats, defeating Conservative Prime Minister Stephen Harper, who only won 99 seats.

Provincial examples
 1935 Prince Edward Island general election – The Prince Edward Island Liberal Party, led by Walter Lea defeated the incumbent Progressive Conservative Party of Prince Edward Island, led by Premier William J. P. MacMillan, with the Liberals winning every seat in the election.
 1987 New Brunswick general election – Frank McKenna's New Brunswick Liberal Association defeated the incumbent majority government of Richard Hatfield and the Progressive Conservative Party of New Brunswick, with the Liberals winning every seat in the election.
 2001 British Columbia general election – The Gordon Campbell-led British Columbia Liberal Party won all but two seats, defeating the sitting British Columbia New Democratic Party government.
 2018 Quebec general election – The populist party Coalition Avenir Québec led by François Legault beat the Quebec Liberal Party, defeating 4-year Premier of Quebec Philippe Couillard.

Costa Rica
 1919 – Julio Acosta García, leader of the recently victorious anti-Tinoco opposition wins with 89% of the votes over Tinoquista José María Soto. 

 1936 – Republican León Cortés Castro wins 60% of support over Octavio Beeche's 34% and Manuel Mora's 5%. 
 1940 – Republican Rafael Ángel Calderón Guardia wins with 84%, his two only rivals were Communist leader Manuel Mora (9%) and Virgilio Salazar from a local Guanacaste party. 
 1944 – Republican Teodoro Picado Michalski wins 75% of the votes over Democratic candidate León Cortes Castro. Republican candidate Calderón re-election in the next year sparks the third and last Costa Rican Civil War.
 1953 – First election after the Civil War, war caudillo José Figueres Ferrer wins 67% of the votes over De=mocratic candidate Fernando Castro Cervantes, after this Costa Rica enters a pretty stable two-party system. 
 1982 – PLN candidate Luis Alberto Monge wins with 58% of the votes over Unity Coalition's candidate Rafael Angel Calderon Fournier after the highly unpopular Carazo administration.
 2014 – In second round PAC's candidate Luis Guillermo Solís wins 77% votes over PLN's Johnny Araya Monge, first ever candidate in reach more than a million votes. 
 2018 – In second round PAC's candidate Carlos Alvarado Quesada wins 60% of the votes over 39% reached by far-right National Restoration's candidate Fabricio Alvarado Muñoz

Dominica
1980 Dominican general election The Dominica Freedom Party led by Opposition Leader Eugenia Charles won 17 out of 21 seats and 51.34% of the popular vote.
2009 Dominican general election The Dominica Labour Party led by Prime Minister Roosevelt Skerrit won 18 out of 21 seats and 61.13% of the popular vote.
2019 Dominican general election The Dominica Labour Party led by Prime Minister Roosevelt Skerrit won 18 out of 21 seats and 61.34% of the popular vote.
2022 Dominican general election The Dominica Labour Party led by Prime Minister Roosevelt Skerrit won 19 out of 21 seats and 58.95% of the popular vote.

Fiji 
1999 — the Fiji Labour Party, led by Mahendra Chaudhry, won a landslide victory, winning 37 of the 71 seats in Parliament (gaining 30 seats). Chaudhry became the country's first Indo-Fijian Prime Minister. The incumbent, Sitiveni Rabuka (leader of Soqosoqo ni Vakavulewa ni Taukei), won just eight seats, losing 23. Five other parties also won a total of 26 seats and independents won eight seats.
2014 - FijiFirst, led by Frank Bainimarama, won a landslide victory in the country's first elections since the 2006 Fijian coup d'état, led by Bainimarama. Bainimarama went on to serve a total of 16 years as Prime Minister, until losing the 2022 Fijian general election to Sitiveni Rabuka due to a hung parliament and the formation of a coalition between the three opposition parties (the People's Alliance, the National Federation Party and the Social Democratic Liberal Party).

France 
Only include those after 1958.
1968 – The Gaullist UDR party, led by future president Georges Pompidou, wins 354 of 487 seats.
1981 – The Socialist Party (PS) wins 269 out of 481 seats.
1993 – The liberal conservative coalition RPR–UDF wins 485 or 84% of the 577 seats.
2002 – Jacques Chirac wins the presidency with 82.1% of the popular vote. His party, the UMP, also won 357 out of 577 seats in the following month’s legislative election.
2017 - Emmanuel Macron won with 66% of the vote, while Marine Le Pen got 33% of the vote.

Grenada 
In Grenadian general elections, a landslide victory involves a large swing from one party to another as well as one party winning a large majority in parliament. Landslide victories have usually occurred after a long period of government from one particular party and a change in the popular mood.

 1999 – The New National Party led by Prime Minister Keith Mitchell won all 15 seats in the House of Representatives and 62.5% of the popular vote. 
 2013 – The New National Party led by Opposition Leader Keith Mitchell won all 15 seats in the House of Representatives and 58.7% of the popular vote. 
 2018 – The New National Party led by Prime Minister Keith Mitchell won all 15 seats in the House of Representatives and 58.9% of the popular vote.

Hong Kong 
Legislative Council elections:
1991 – The pro-democracy camp won 16 of the 18 directly elected geographical constituency seats, with a coalition of the United Democrats of Hong Kong and the Meeting Point taking 14 of the seats.
1995 – The pro-democracy camp swept 16 of the 20 directly elected geographical constituency seats in which the Democratic Party alone took 12 directly elected seats.
2021 – The pro-Beijing camp took 89 out of 90 seats in the Legislative Council. Many democratic candidates had been barred from running, and turnout was extremely low.  
Local elections:
2019 – The pro-democracy camp seized control of 17 of the 18 District Councils, tripling their seats from about 124 to 389. The pro-Beijing parties and independents won only 61 seats, a loss of 242 seats, received their largest defeat in history.

Hungary 
2022 – Despite an electoral alliance of almost all opposition parties, Fidesz–KDNP won 88 of the 100 constituencies thus winning a super-majority for the fourth time in a row.

Italy 
2005 Italian regional elections – The Union centre-left coalition won the presidency in 12 out of 14 regions that were holding elections that year. After this election the centre-left controlled the presidency in 16 out of Italy's 20 regions.
2020 Venetian regional election – Incumbent president of Veneto Luca Zaia (Lega) won carrying 76.79% of the vote, five times as many as his main opponent Arturo Lorenzoni's (PD) 15.72%.

Jamaica 
In Jamaican elections, a landslide victory involves a large swing from one party to another as well as one party winning a large majority in parliament. Landslide victories have usually occurred after a long period of government from one particular party and a change in the popular mood.

 1983 Jamaican general election – The Jamaica Labour Party led by Prime Minister Edward Seaga won all 60 seats in the House of Representatives and 89.7% of the popular vote. The opposition People's National Party boycotted this election. 
2011 Jamaican general election – The People's National Party (PNP) led by Portia Simpson-Miller secured 42 seats to 21 for the Jamaica Labour Party. 
2020 Jamaican general election – The Jamaica Labour Party led by Andrew Holness was re-elected after winning a supermajority in Parliament.

Mexico
 2018 – Left-wing Andrés Manuel López Obrador wins with 53% of the votes, his closest rival is PAN's Ricardo Anaya with 22%, the highest amount of the post-PRI era. Most elections before 2000 had PRI winning by a landslide victory however due to Mexico's de facto one party system at the time, these elections are generally considered to be undemocratic.

Monaco
Monaco is traditionally dominated by conservative parties with only two cases in which left-of-centre parties won any seats (1963 and 1973).
 1968 - The governing National and Democratic Union, led by August Médecin, won a landslide victory, winning 18 seats on the National Council.
 Between 1978 and 1988 - The governing National and Democratic Union hold all 18 seats on the National Council.
 1998 - The governing National and Democratic Union, led by Jean-Louis Campora, won a landslide victory, winning all 18 seats on the National Council.
 2023 - The governing Monegasque National Union, led by Brigitte Boccone-Pagès, won a landslide victory, winning all 24 seats on the National Council.

New Zealand 
Until 1993, New Zealand used the traditional first-past-the-post system as in the U.K. to determine representation in its Parliament. Thus, landslide elections at that time were defined in an identical fashion, i.e. where one party got an overwhelming majority of the seats. Since 1996, New Zealand has used the mixed member proportional system as in Germany, making landslides much less likely.

First past the post
 – The Liberals won 51 seats and 57.8% of the vote while the Conservatives won 13 seats and just 24.5% of the vote.
 – The Liberals won 49 seats and 52.7% of the vote while the Conservatives won 19 seats and just 36.6% of the vote.
 – The Liberals won 58 seats and 53.1% of the vote while the Conservatives won 16 seats and just 29.7% of the vote.
 – The Reform Party won 55 seats while the Labour & Liberal parties won just 23 seats combined.
 – The Labour Party won 53 seats while the Coalition won just 19 seats.
 – The Labour Party won 53 seats while the National Party won just 25 seats.
 – The Labour Party won 55 seats while the National Party won just 32 seats.
 – The National Party won 55 seats while the Labour Party won just 32 seats.
 – The Labour Party won 56 seats while the National Party won just 37 seats.
 – The National Party won 67 seats while the Labour Party won just 29 seats.

MMP
 – The Labour Party won 52 seats while the National Party won just 27 seats.
 – The National Party won 59 seats while the Labour Party won just 34 seats.
 – The National Party won 60 seats while the Labour Party won just 32 seats.
 – The Labour Party won 65 seats while the National Party won just 33 seats (the first time any party won an overall majority under MMP)

Papua New Guinea 
 2007: The National Alliance Party, led by Sir Michael Somare, won 27 of the 109 seats in the National Parliament, gaining eight seats. In contrast, no other party won over seven seats.
 2022: The Pangu Pati, led by James Marape, was re-elected following a landslide victory. The Pangu Pati won 39 of the 113 seats in the National Parliament, gaining 30 seats. In contrast, the People's National Congress, led by former Prime Minister Peter O'Neill, won 17 seats, losing 11 seats. However, no party won a majority of seats (57 seats needed for a majority).

Philippines 
In 1941, the Nacionalista Party won the presidency, vice presidency, all seats in the Senate, and all but 3 seats in the House of Representatives. This was the biggest landslide in Philippine history. The legislators won't serve until 1945 though, due to World War II.

Starting in 1987, the Philippines evolved into a multi-party system, and coupled with the introduction of party-list elections in 1998, no party was able to win a landslide, much less a majority of seats, in the House of Representatives since then. This has also meant that no presidential and vice presidential election winner won a majority of votes, although, in 1998, the winners were described as having landslide victories, despite winning less than a majority of votes, due to large winning margins. Senatorial landslides are more possible though in midterm elections, as voters are usually presented with two distinct choices. The 2022 presidential election was the first landslide since 1987.

Presidential and vice presidential elections

In the Philippines, while there are presidential tickets, the positions of president and vice president are elected separately.
 1897 – Emilio Aguinaldo won with 57% of the vote. with his other two contemporaries being Andres Bonifacio with 31% and Mariano Trias having 12% of the vote.
 1935 – Manuel L. Quezon won with 68% of the vote. His running mate, Sergio Osmeña, won with 86% of the vote. Their second placers had 18% and 8% of the vote, respectively.
 1941 – Manuel L. Quezon won with 82% of the vote. His running mate, Sergio Osmeña, won with 92% of the vote. Their opponents had 18% and 8% of the vote, respectively. This was the biggest landslide in an election where major opposition parties participated.
 1953 – Ramon Magsaysay won with 69% of the vote. His running mate, Carlos P. Garcia, won with 63% of the vote. Their opponents had 31% and 37% of the vote, respectively.
 1981 – Ferdinand Marcos won with 89% of the vote, and won in every province, with the main opposition coalition boycotting the election. This is the largest landslide in history.
 1998 – Joseph Estrada won with 40% of the vote. His main opponent, Jose de Venecia, received just 16%, or a margin of 24%. De Venecia's running mate, Gloria Macapagal Arroyo, won with almost 50% of the vote. Her main opponent, Estrada's running mate Edgardo Angara, received just 22%, or a margin of about 28%.
 2022 – Bongbong Marcos won with 59% of the vote. His main rival, Leni Robredo, got 28% of the vote. Marcos' running mate, Sara Duterte, won with 62% of the vote. Her main rival, Francis Pangilinan, got 18% of the vote.

Senate
 1941 – Nacionalista Party won all 24 seats in the Senate. This was the only time that the Senate had no members from the opposition.
 1949 – The Liberal Party won all 8 seats contested. 
 1951 – The Nacionalista Party won all 9 seats contested.
 1955 – The Nacionalista Party won all 9 seats contested. The Nacionalistas then had 21 of the 24 seats in the Senate, leaving the Liberals with none.
 1987 – Lakas ng Bayan won 22 of 24 seats. Their main opponents, the Grand Alliance for Democracy, won 2.
 2019 – The ruling party, Hugpong ng Pagbabago won 9 of the 12 seats contested. Their main opponents, Otso Diretso won no seats. The other 3 seats went to other parties.

House of Representatives
 1907 – The Nacionalista Party won 59 of 80 seats. The Progresista Party won 16. From 1907 to 1919, the Nacionalistas won every election in large margins, as they advocated Philippine independence from the United States, over their opponents' more conservative approach to the issue. From 1922 to 1935, the Nacionalistas were split into factions, until they were reunited in time for the 1938 election.
 1938 – The Nacionalista Party won all 98 seats. This was the only time that the House of Representatives had no members from the opposition.
 1941 – The Nacionalista Party won 95 seats. The other 3 seats were won by independents.
 1957 – The Nacionalista Party won 82 seats. The Liberal Party won just 19.
 1969 – The Nacionalista Party won 88 seats. The Liberal Party won just 18.
 1978 – The Kilusang Bagong Lipunan won 150 seats. Their opposition Lakas ng Bayan, won no seats. Minor and regional parties won the remaining 15 seats.

Portugal 
Legislative Elections
 1987 - The centre-right Social Democratic Party led by Cavaco Silva won 148 out of the 250 seats and 50.2% of the popular vote. The second most voted party, the Socialist Party would receive just 22.2% of the total voting, falling 28 percentage points behind the winners.
 1991 - Following the success attained in the previous legislative elections, the Social Democratic Party led by Cavaco Silva won 135 out of the 230 seats and 50.6% of the popular vote. The Socialist Party would also rise in voting, receiving 29.1% of the votes, but would still be far short of the Social Democrats.

Presidential Elections
 1976 - António Ramalho Eanes, supported by the center-right and center-left political parties secured 61.6% of the total vote, while the second most voted candidate, FP-25 leader Otelo Saraiva de Carvalho, got 16.5% of the vote.
 1991 - Incumbent president Mário Soares, supported by both the socialists and the social democrats achieved 70.3% of the total votes, while the second most voted candidate, Basilio Horta secured only 14.2% of the votes.
 2006 - Aníbal Cavaco Silva, supported by the center-right parties, secured 50.5% of the votes in the first turn. Second most voted candidate, socialist Manuel Alegre would only secure 20.7%.
 2011 - Incumbent president, Aníbal Cavaco Silva, supported by the center-right parties achieved 53% of the total voting, the second most voted candidate, socialist Manuel Alegre would only score 19.7%.
 2016 - Marcelo Rebelo de Sousa, supported by the center-right parties and benefiting from bigger media exposure than the rest of the candidates secured 52% of the votes in the first turn. Second most voted candidate António Sampaio da Nóvoa would only score 23% of voting.
 2021 - Incumbent president, Marcelo Rebelo de Sousa, would renew his term receiving 60.6% of the total voting, whilst the second most voted candidate, socialist MEP Ana Gomes received only 13% of the votes. Rebelo de Sousa became the first presidential candidate to win in all the municipalities.

Regional Elections

Alberto João Jardim, member of the Social Democratic Party was the president of the Madeira region from 1978 to 2015. During this period of time, landslide victories for the Social Democrats were the norm.

  - Social Democrats took 59.6%, the 2nd most voted party, Socialist Party  took only 22.3%
  - Social Democrats took 65.3%, the 2nd most voted party, Socialist Party  took only 15%
  - Social Democrats took 67.8%, the 2nd most voted party, Socialist Party  took only 15.3%
  - Social Democrats took 62.3%, the 2nd most voted party, Socialist Party  took only 16.8%
  - Social Democrats took 56.9%, the 2nd most voted party, Socialist Party  took only 22.6%
 1996 Madeiran regional election - Social Democrats took 56.9%, the 2nd most voted party, Socialist Party  took only 24.8%
 2000 Madeiran regional election - Social Democrats took 56.0%, the 2nd most voted party, Socialist Party  took only 21.0%
 2004 Madeiran regional election - Social Democrats took 53.7%, the 2nd most voted party, Socialist Party  took only 27.4%
 2007 Madeiran regional election - Social Democrats took 64.2%, the 2nd most voted party, Socialist Party  took only 15.4%

  -  Social Democratic Party led by Mota Amaral took 30 of the 43 seats and 57.4% of the votes, the Socialist Party would only score 27.2%
  -  Social Democratic Party led by incumbent Azorean regional government president Mota Amaral took 28 of the 43 seats and 56.4% of the votes, the Socialist Party would only score 24.2%

Samoa 

2006 - The Human Rights Protection Party, led by Tuilaʻepa Saʻilele Malielegaoi, won a landslide victory, winning 33 seats, an increase of ten. The main opposition party, the new Samoa Democratic United Party, won 10 seats.
2016 - The Human Rights Protection Party, led by Tuilaʻepa Saʻilele Malielegaoi, won by a landslide victory, winning 35 of the 49 seats in the Legislative Assembly, gaining six seats. The main opposition party, the Tautua Samoa Party (led by Palusalue Faʻapo II) only won three seats, losing 11 seats. Independents won 13 seats.

Slovakia 

2012 – Direction – Social Democracy won an absolute majority of 83 out of 150 seats. It was the first time since the Velvet Revolution that a single party formed the government. The early elections followed the fall of Prime Minister Iveta Radičová's Slovak Democratic and Christian Union – Democratic Party-led coalition in October 2011 over a no confidence vote, which her government had lost because of its support for the European Financial Stability Fund.

Spain 
1982 and 1986 – Felipe González's Spanish Socialist Workers' Party (PSOE) won two consecutive blowouts, with advantages of 22 and 18 percentage points over the second party, Manuel Fraga's right-wing People's Alliance, which scored just over one hundred seats and won only one region, Galicia. In 1982, PSOE won over 200 seats, the only time this has been achieved by a sole party.
2000 – Ruling José María Aznar's People's Party (PP) won by 10 percentage points to the PSOE.
2011 – local, regional and national elections were all landslide wins for the then-in opposition Mariano Rajoy's PP, winning the national election by a 16 percentage point margin to then-ruling PSOE.

Basque Country 

 2001 – Juan Jose Ibarretxe's Basque National Party-Basque Solidarity (PNV-EA) alliance won 33 seats and 42.2% of the share, 20 pecentage points ahead of PP. The result is the best performance for the top voted list in a Basque regional election. With a record turnout of 79%, PNV-EA obtained more than 600,000 votes. PNV-EA also won more seats than PP (19) and PSE-EE (13) together, and was able to secure a working majority in parliament.

Saint Vincent and the Grenadines 
A landslide victory in the elections of St. Vincent and the Grenadines involves a large swing from one party to another as well as one party winning a large majority in parliament. Landslide victories have usually occurred after a long period of government from one particular party and a change in the popular mood.

 1989 – The New Democratic Party led by Prime Minister James Fitz-Allen Mitchell won all 15 seats in the House of Assembly and 66.3% of the popular vote.

Taiwan 

 1996 presidential election – As the first direct presidential election in Taiwan, the incumbent president Lee Teng-hui of Kuomintang won 54% of the votes while Peng Ming-min of the Democratic Progressive Party took only 21.1%.
 2008 legislative election – Kuomintang won 81 seats while the Democratic Progressive Party won 27 seats.
 2008 presidential election – Ma Ying-jeou of Kuomintang won 58.5% of the votes while Frank Hsieh took only 41.5%. 

Presidential and Legislative Election held on the same day
 2016 – Tsai Ing-wen representing for the Democratic Progressive Party won 56.1% of the votes while Eric Chu of the Kuomintang took 31%. In the legislative election, Democratic Progressive Party won 68 seats while Kuomintang won 35 seats.
 2020 – Tsai Ing-wen won a record 8.17 million votes for her second term, representing 57.1% of the popular vote, while Han Kuo-yu of Kuomintang took 38.6%. In the legislative election, the ruling party Democratic Progressive Party won 61 seats while Kuomintang won 38 seats.

Trinidad and Tobago 
In Trinidad and Tobago's elections, a landslide victory involves a large swing from one party to another as well as one party winning a large majority in parliament. Landslide victories have usually occurred after a long period of government from one particular party and a change in the popular mood. Party politics and the political structure in Trinidad and Tobago has generally run along ethic lines with most Afro-Trinidadians supporting the People's National Movement (PNM) and most Indo-Trinidadians supporting various Indian-majority parties, such as the current United National Congress (UNC) or its predecessors.

 1971 – The People's National Movement led by Prime Minister Eric Williams won all 41 seats in the House of Representatives and 84.1% of the popular vote. Major opposition parties boycotted this election.
 2010 – The People's Partnership led by Kamla Persad-Bissessar won 29 of the 41 seats in the House of Representatives. The election victory marked a change where the incumbent People's National Movement party led by Prime Minister Patrick Manning were voted out of power.

Tobago

 2013 Tobago House of Assembly election – The Tobago Council of the People's National Movement led by Chief Secretary Orville London won all 12 seats in the Tobago House of Assembly and 61.4% of the popular vote.

United Kingdom 

In UK General Elections, a landslide victory involves winning a large majority in parliament and often goes with a large swing from one party to another as well. Landslide victories have usually occurred after a long period of government from one particular party and a change in the popular mood.  In the past a majority of over 100 was regarded as the technical hurdle to be defined as a landslide, as that allows the government freedom to easily enact its policies in parliament.  In more recent times, the label 'landslide' has been applied in numerous press articles to victories which would not previously have been regarded as such, for example the Conservative Party majority of 80 in 2019.  Its current usage is more as political commentary rather than technical definition and is a reflection of the strength of the party's ability to put its programme through parliament.

The largest landslide by any single party in the UK parliament, since universal suffrage was introduced, was the majority of 179 won by Tony Blair's Labour Party in 1997.

Notable landslide election results

1906 – Henry Campbell-Bannerman led his Liberal Party to victory over Arthur Balfour's Conservative Party who lost more than half their seats, including his own seat in Manchester East, as a result of the large national swing to the Liberal Party (The 5.4% swing from the Conservatives to Liberals was at the time the highest ever achieved). The Liberal Party won 397 seats (an increase of 214) while the Conservative Party were left with 156 seats (a decrease of 246).
 1945 – Clement Attlee led his Labour Party to victory over Winston Churchill's Conservative Party, a 12.0% swing from the Conservatives to Labour. Labour won 393 seats (an increase of 239) while the Conservative Party were left with 197 (a decrease of 190).
1966 – Harold Wilson led the Labour Party to win 364 seats (an increase of 47) and gained an overall majority of 98 while the Conservative Party won 253 seats (a decrease of 51).
 1983 – Margaret Thatcher won her second term in office with a landslide victory for the Conservatives gaining an overall majority of 144 by winning 397 seats (an increase of 38 seats) on 42.4% of the national vote and forcing her main opponent Michael Foot to resign after Labour won 209 seats.
1987 –  Margaret Thatcher won her third term in office with a second landslide victory for the Conservatives gaining an overall majority of 102 by winning 376 seats (a decrease of 21 seats).
 1997 – Tony Blair led the Labour Party to win 418 seats (an increase of 145) and gained an overall majority of 179 while the Conservative Party won 165 seats (a decrease of 178). The swing from the Conservatives to Labour was 10.2% and was the second biggest general election victory of the 20th Century after 1931.
2001 – Tony Blair led the Labour Party win 412 seats (a decrease of 6) and gained an overall majority of 167 while the Conservative Party won 166 seats (an increase of 1). Making Tony Blair the first Labour Prime Minister to serve two consecutive full terms in office.
 2019 – Boris Johnson led the Conservative Party win a total of 365 seats (an increase of 48) and a majority of 80 seat, the party's largest majority since 1987. It left the Labour Party, who were led by Jeremy Corbyn, with 202 seats (a decrease of 60, their worst result since 1935). The election led to 54 Labour seats changing to Conservative predominantly in the Midlands and Northern England - some of which had been held by Labour since the first half of the 20th century.

Scotland

2011 Scottish Parliament Election – Alex Salmond led the Scottish National Party to a second term in Scottish Government with unprecedented success when they became the first party in Scotland to win an overall majority under an electoral system which was supposed to prevent such a result winning 69 seats and led to the holding of the 2014 Scottish independence referendum. The Scottish Labour Party only lost 7 seats overall however lost 22 constituency seats to the SNP in their worst result in Scotland for almost thirty years.
2015 UK General Election (Scotland) – The Scottish National Party led by First Minister Nicola Sturgeon who took over from Alex Salmond following the 2014 Scottish independence referendum won 56 out of 59 Westminster parliamentary constituency seats in Scotland, an increase of 50. The SNP, additionally, achieved 50% of the total votes in Scotland, 30% higher than the previous election. The Scottish Labour Party were reduced to one seat, from 41. The overall swing in Scotland was 23.9% from Labour to the SNP.

United States 

A landslide victory in U.S. Presidential elections occurs when a candidate has an overwhelming majority in the Electoral College.
 1804 – Thomas Jefferson (D-R) received 162 (92%) of the electoral votes while Charles Cotesworth Pinckney (Federalist) received only 14 (8%). Jefferson won 72.8% of the popular vote, the highest margin of victory in any presidential election with multiple major candidates, although several states did not record the popular vote.
 1816 – James Monroe (D-R) received 183 (83.9%) of the electoral votes while Rufus King (Federalist) received only 34 (15.6%).
 1840 – William Henry Harrison (Whig) received 234 (79.6%) of the electoral votes while Martin Van Buren (D) received only 60 (20.4%).
 1852 – Franklin Pierce (D) received 254 (85.8%) of the electoral votes while Winfield Scott (Whig) received only 42 (14.2%).
 1864 – Abraham Lincoln (R) received 212 (90.6%) of the electoral votes while George B. McClellan (D) received only 21 (9%).
 1872 – Ulysses S. Grant (R) received 286 (81.9%) of the electoral votes while four candidates split the remaining 66 due to the death of Horace Greeley (D).
 1912 – Woodrow Wilson (D) received 435 (81.9%) of the electoral votes while Theodore Roosevelt (Progressive) received 88 (16.6%) and William Howard Taft (R) received only 8 (1.5%)—the worst showing ever by an incumbent president. Wilson won just 41.8% of the popular vote in the three-way race, compared to 27.4% for Roosevelt and 23.2% for Taft.
 1920 - Warren G. Harding (R) received 404 electoral votes, (76.08%) of the electoral vote. James M. Cox (D) only received 127 (23.92%).                                               
 1924 - Calvin Coolidge (R) received 382 electoral votes, (71.94%) of the electoral vote. John W. Davis (D) only received 136 (25.61%) and Robert M. La Follette (Progressive) received only 13 (2.45%).                                                                                                                              
 1928 – Herbert Hoover (R) received 444 (83.6%) of the electoral votes while Al Smith (D) received only 87 (16.4%).
 1932 – Franklin D. Roosevelt (D) received 472 (88.9%) of the electoral votes while Herbert Hoover (R) received only 59 (11.1%).
 1936 – Franklin D. Roosevelt (D) received 523 (98.5%) of the electoral votes—the largest share since 1820 and the largest in a non-unanimous election—while Alf Landon (R) received only 8 (1.5%). Additionally, Roosevelt received 60.8% of the popular vote.
 1940 – Franklin D. Roosevelt (D) received 449 (84.6%) of the electoral votes while Wendell Willkie (R) received only 82 (15.4%).
 1944 – Franklin D. Roosevelt (D) received 432 (81.4%) of the electoral votes while Thomas E. Dewey (R) received only 99 (18.6%).
 1952 – Dwight D. Eisenhower (R) received 442 (83.2%) of the electoral votes while Adlai Stevenson II (D) received only 89 (16.8%).
 1956 – Dwight D. Eisenhower (R) received 457 (86.1%) of the electoral votes while Adlai Stevenson II (D) received only 73 (13.7%).
 1964 – Lyndon B. Johnson (D) received 486 (90.3%) of the electoral votes while Barry Goldwater (R) received only 52 (9.7%). 
 1972 – Richard Nixon (R) received 520 (96.7%) of the electoral votes while George McGovern (D) received only 17 (3.2%). One Republican elector voted for John Hospers of the Libertarian Party. Additionally, Nixon received 60.7% of the popular vote.
 1980 – Ronald Reagan (R) received 489 (90.9%) of the electoral votes while Jimmy Carter (D) received only 49 (9.1%).
 1984 – Ronald Reagan (R) received 525 (97.6%) of the electoral votes while Walter Mondale (D) received only 13 (2.4%).
 1988 – George H. W. Bush (R) received 426 (79.2%) of the electoral votes while Michael Dukakis (D) received only 111 (20.8%).

See also 
 Wipeout (elections)
 Realigning election 
 Wave elections in the United States
 Blowout (sports)
 Landslide (board game)
 Paper candidate

References 

 
Elections
Elections in the United Kingdom
Elections terminology
Politics of the British Isles
Politics of the United Kingdom